Charlotta Ingrid “Lotta” Flink-Saigeon (born 18 January 1965) is a Hong Kong backstroke, freestyle and medley swimmer. She competed in five events at the 1984 Summer Olympics.

References

External links
 

1965 births
Living people
Hong Kong female backstroke swimmers
Hong Kong female freestyle swimmers
Hong Kong female medley swimmers
Olympic swimmers of Hong Kong
Swimmers at the 1984 Summer Olympics
Commonwealth Games competitors for Hong Kong
Swimmers at the 1982 Commonwealth Games
Place of birth missing (living people)